Kawela is a 2017 Punjabi psychological thriller movie written and directed by Amanjit Singh Brar and starring Harp Farmer, Mahabir Bhullar and Shehnaaz Gill. The release date of the movie is 21 April 2017.

Cast 
Mahabir Bhullar as Inspector Gurjinder Singh
Harp Farmer as Inspector Karamveer Singh

Track List

References

External links
 Official Facebook Page

Punjabi-language Indian films
2010s Punjabi-language films